Elizabeth Muriel Gregory "Elsie" MacGill,  (March 27, 1905November 4, 1980), known as the "Queen of the Hurricanes", was the world's first woman to earn an aeronautical engineering degree and was the first woman in Canada to receive a bachelor's degree in electrical engineering. She worked as an aeronautical engineer during the Second World War and did much to make Canada a powerhouse of aircraft construction during her years at Canadian Car and Foundry (CC&F) in Fort William, Ontario. After her work at CC&F, she ran a successful consulting business. Between 1967 and 1970, she was a commissioner on the Royal Commission on the Status of Women in Canada, which reported in 1970.

Early life and education
MacGill was born in Vancouver on March 27, 1905, youngest daughter of James Henry MacGill, a prominent Vancouver lawyer, part-time journalist, and Anglican deacon, and Helen Gregory MacGill, a journalist and British Columbia's first woman judge. She had two older step-brothers from her mother's first marriage, and an older sister with whom she was very close.

In the early years, the MacGill children were home schooled in a formal setting to mimic that of Lord Roberts, the public school that the older boys attended. This included drawing lessons with Emily Carr, and swimming lessons with Joe Fortes. Later, they attended King George Secondary School, which was affiliated with McGill University. This rigorous education facilitated Elsie entering the University of British Columbia when she was 16. She was admitted to the applied sciences program, but the dean of the faculty asked her to leave after only one term.

When MacGill was 12 years old, her mother was appointed judge of the juvenile court of Vancouver. After 1911, the racial strife in British Columbia continued to escalate, and Jim MacGill's immigration-related legal work was directly impacted. This caused severe financial strain for the family during the war years. Her early aptitude for "fixing things" held the family in good stead, and informed discussions of possible careers.

MacGill's mother was an advocate of women's suffrage and influenced her decision to study engineering. She graduated from the University of Toronto in 1927, and was the first Canadian woman to earn a degree in electrical engineering.

MacGill was admitted to the University of Toronto's Bachelor of Applied Sciences program in 1923. During the summers she worked in machine shops repairing electrical motors to supplement the theory and practical teachings during the school year. It is also here that she became exposed to the nascent field of aeronautical engineering. Contracting polio just before her graduation, MacGill was told that she would probably spend the rest of her life in a wheelchair. She refused to accept that possibility, however, and learned to walk supported by two strong metal canes. She became Canada's first woman graduate in electrical engineering.

Following graduation, MacGill took a junior job with a firm in Pontiac, Michigan. During the time there, the company began producing aircraft, which furthered her interest in aeronautics. She began part-time graduate studies in aeronautical engineering at the University of Michigan, enrolling in the fall of 1927 in the full-time Master of Science in Engineering program to begin aircraft design work and conduct research and development in the university's new aeronautics facilities. In 1929, she became the first woman in North America, and likely the world, to be awarded a master's degree in aeronautical engineering.

In order to help finance her doctoral studies at MIT in Cambridge MacGill wrote magazine articles about aircraft and flying. Her contemporary at MIT was aeronautical engineer and technical writer, M. Elsa Gardner.

Engineering career

In 1934, MacGill started work at Fairchild Aircraft's operations in Longueuil as an assistant aeronautical engineer. In 1938, she was the first woman elected to corporate membership in the Engineering Institute of Canada (EIC). She presented a paper, "Simplified Performance Calculations for Aeroplanes", to the Royal Aeronautical Society in Ottawa, on March 22, 1938 to high praise. It was later published in The Engineering Journal. She also participated in the Canadian Broadcasting Corporation's six-part series, The Engineer in War Time; her segment was called "Aircraft Engineering in Wartime Canada". In 1942, she was elected to the position of chairman of the EIC, Lakehead Branch, after having also served as their vice-chairman.

Later that year MacGill was hired as chief aeronautical engineer at Canadian Car and Foundry (CanCar), becoming the first woman in the world to hold such a position. At CanCar she designed and tested a new training aircraft, the Maple Leaf Trainer II.

The Maple Leaf Trainer was designed and first built in CanCar's Fort William (now Thunder Bay) factories, where MacGill had moved. Although the Maple Leaf II did not enter service with any Commonwealth forces, ten (two were completed, but eight had to be assembled in Mexico) were sold to Mexico where its high-altitude performance was important given the many airfields from which it had to operate. Her role in the company changed when the factory was selected to build the Hawker Hurricane fighter aircraft for the Royal Air Force (RAF). The factory quickly expanded from about 500 workers to 4,500 by war's end, half of them women. For much of the war MacGill's primary task was to streamline operations in the production line as the factories rapidly expanded. MacGill was also responsible for designing solutions to allow the aircraft to operate during the winter, introducing de-icing controls and a system for fitting skis for landing on snow.

By the time the production line shut down in 1943, CanCar had produced over 1,400 Hurricanes. In 1940 she wrote and presented a paper on the experience, "Factors Affecting Mass Production of Aeroplanes", later published in The Engineering Journal . Her role in this successful production run made her famous, even to the point of having a comic book biography appear in an issue of True Comics in 1942, using her nickname, "Queen of the Hurricanes”. Numerous popular stories were published about her in the media as well, reflecting the public's fascination with this female engineer.

After Hurricane production ended, CanCar looked for new work and secured with a contract from the U.S. Navy to build Curtiss SB2C Helldivers. This production did not go nearly as smoothly, and a continual stream of minor changes from Curtiss-Wright (in turn demanded by the U.S. Navy) meant that full-scale production took a long time to get started. In the midst of this project MacGill and the works manager, E. J. (Bill) Soulsby, were dismissed. It was initially rumoured that Soulsby had been curt with a group of senior naval officers who had visited a week earlier, but it was later revealed the reason for the dismissals was that the two were having an affair.

MacGill and Soulsby were married in 1943 and moved to Toronto, where they set up an aeronautical consulting business. In 1946, she became the first woman to serve as Technical Advisor for International Civil Aviation Organization (ICAO), where she helped to draft International Air Worthiness regulations for the design and production of commercial aircraft. In 1947 she became the chairman of the United Nations Stress Analysis Committee, the first woman ever to chair a UN committee.

In 1952, MacGill presented a paper to the Society of Women Engineers (SWE) conference, "The Initiative in Airliner Design", that was subsequently published in The Engineering Journal. A year later they awarded her their annual Engineering Award.

Women's rights
After breaking her leg in 1953, MacGill used the opportunity of her months of convalescence to sort through her mother's papers and begin writing a biography of her mother's life. MacGill published the book, My Mother, the Judge: A Biography of Judge Helen Gregory MacGill, in 1955. Her mother and grandmother's active public service and work in the suffrage movement inspired her to spend an increasing amount of time dealing with women's rights during the 1960s.

MacGill served as the president of the Canadian Federation of Business and Professional Women's Clubs from 1962 to 1964. In 1967 she was named to the Royal Commission on the Status of Women in Canada and co-authored the report published in 1970. She also filed a "Separate Statement" describing those of her opinions that differed from the majority on the commission. For example, she wanted abortion removed from the entirety of the Criminal Code.

MacGill was also a member of the Ontario Status of Women Committee, an affiliate of the National Action Committee on the Status of Women. For this work she was given the Order of Canada in 1971.

MacGill once said:

Later life
After a short illness, MacGill died on November 4, 1980, in Cambridge, Massachusetts. In noting her death, Shirley Allen, a Canadian member of the Ninety-Nines organization of women aviators said of her: "She had a brilliant mind and was recognized as an outstanding Canadian woman. Neither gender nor disability prevented her from using her talents to serve her community and country."

Awards and honours

MacGill's paper, Factors Affecting the Mass Production of Aeroplanes, won the Gzowski Medal from the Engineering Institute of Canada in 1941. In 1953, she was one of only 50 people, and the only woman, to have her picture in the exclusive Gevaert Gallery of Canadian Executives to honour her contributions and influence. In 1953 the Society of Women Engineers (in the U.S.) presented her with its Achievement Award "in recognition of her meritorious contributions to aeronautical engineering," the first time that the Award had gone out of the United States.

MacGill was awarded the Centennial Medal by the Canadian government in 1967, and the Order of Canada in 1971 for "services as an aeronautical engineering consultant and as a member of the Royal Commission on the Status of Women." The Ninety-Nines awarded her the Amelia Earhart Medal in 1975; and in 1979 the Ontario Association of Professional Engineers presented her with their gold medal.

Posthumous recognition 
In 1983 MacGill was inducted into Canada's Aviation Hall of Fame, and in 1992 she was a founding inductee in the Canadian Science and Engineering Hall of Fame in Ottawa.

Her life story is part of the documentary Rosies of the North (1999).

In 2016, she was proposed as one of five finalists to be on Canadian banknotes, a competition closed to men.

In 2019, the Lakehead District School Board approved Ecole Elsie MacGill Public School as the name of the still-under construction elementary school that will replace Agnew H. Johnston and Edgewater Park public schools when it opens in September 2020.

Also in 2019, she was the honoree of a Canada Post stamp as part of the "Canadians in Flight" series.

In October 2020 she was the topic of a Heritage Minute short film honouring her achievements in the Second World War.

See also
 Women in warfare (1945-1999)

Archives
There is a Elsie Gregory MacGill fonds at Library and Archives Canada. Archival reference number is R4349.

References

Notes

Bibliography

 Bourgeois-Doyle, Richard I. Her Daughter the Engineer: The Life of Elsie Gregory MacGill. Ottawa: NRC Research Press, 2008. .
 Bourgeois-Doyle, Richard I. Six decades later, SWE pioneer Elsie MacGill continues to inspire. SWE Magazine,v. 57, n. 2, Spring 2011, pp. 28–32, 32a-32z (web exclusive including chapter 2 of Her Daughter the Engineer) Society of Women Engineers ISSN 1070-6232.
 Green, John J. "Obituary: Elizabeth (Elsie) Gregory MacGill, FC AS1, 1905–1980." Unpublished text from memorial service held Wednesday, November 26, 1980. University of Toronto Archives.
 Hatch, Sybil. Changing Our World: True Stories of Women Engineers. Reston, Virginia: American Society of Civil Engineers, 2006. .
 MacGill, E.M.G. "Factors affecting mass production of aeroplanes". Flight, v. 38, n. 1656, September 19, 1940, pp. 228–231.
 MacGill, E.M.G. My Mother, the Judge: A Biography of Judge Helen Gregory MacGill. Toronto: Ryerson Press, 1955; reprinted in 1981 by Toronto: PMA Books. .
 Sissons, Crystal. Queen of the Hurricanes: The Fearless Elsie MacGill. Toronto: Second Story Press, 2014. .
 Wakewich, Pamela. " 'Queen of the Hurricanes': Elsie Gregory MacGill, aeronautical engineer and women's advocate." in Cook, Sharon Anne, Lorna R. McLean and Kate O'Rourke, eds. Framing Our Past: Canadian Women's History in the Twentieth Century. Montreal: McGill-Queen's University Press, 2006, First edition 2001. .

External links
 Short profile of MacGill Canada's Aviation Hall of Fame
 Elsie MacGill – Queen of the Hurricanes from the CBC
 Elizabeth "Elsie" MacGill from the Canada Science and Technology Museum
 Biography of MacGill and bibliography from Library and Archives Canada
 Elsie Gregory MacFill fonds, Archives of Ontario
  "Her Daughter the Engineer: The Life of Elsie Gregory MacGill by Richard I. Bourgeois-Doyle" from the National Research Council Canada Research Press Monographs Publishing Program
 Rosies of the North directed by Kelly Saxberg, National Film Board of Canada, 1999; a documentary about the Canadian Car and Foundry Company during the Second World War when Elsie MacGill was its chief engineer.
 Review of the NFB film Rosies of the North in CM, the magazine of the Manitoba Library Association.

1905 births
1980 deaths
Canadian aerospace engineers
Canadian Car and Foundry people
Canadian engineering researchers
Officers of the Order of Canada
Scientists from Vancouver
Canadian women engineers
University of Toronto alumni
University of Michigan College of Engineering alumni
Persons of National Historic Significance (Canada)
20th-century women engineers
Aircraft designers
20th-century Canadian women scientists